The Universal Alliance of Diamond Workers (UADW) was a small global union federation bringing together workers in the diamond polishing and jewellery making.

History
The federation was founded in Antwerp in 1905.  Its aims were to provide information on the industrial and social situations relevant to its members, and to conduct its own research.

In its early years, the federation grew, representing 22,700 workers by 1913.  But this gradually declined; by 1982, the federation had affiliates in Belgium, France, Israel, the Netherlands and the United Kingdom, but they represented a total of only 10,100 members, making it by far the smallest global union federation.

The federation remained at around 10,000 workers until 1993, when member unions in the Belgium, Israel and the Netherlands decided to relaunch it, with a focus on attracting unions outside Europe.  It began campaigning against poor labour practices in diamond mining, including a call for children under 14 being banned from working in the industry, and a ban on dangerous cobalt "scaifes" (polishing wheels).  This was successful, and by 2006 had members in Africa, Asia and Latin America.

In September 2000, the federation merged into the much larger International Federation of Chemical, Energy, Mine and General Workers' Unions.

Affiliates
In 1960, the following unions were affiliated to the federation:

Leadership

General Secretaries
1905: Jef Groesser
1910: J. Jans
1912: Louis van Berckelaer
1936: Alf Daems
1946: Franz Schoeters
1980s: Constant Denisse
1990s: Jef Hoymans

Presidents
1905: Henri Polak
1946: Pieter Van Muijden
1950: Ies Mug
1958: H. Van Eerde

References

Trade unions established in 1905
Trade unions disestablished in 2000
Global union federations
Manufacturing trade unions
1905 establishments in Belgium